The Frederick and Grace Greenwood House is a house located in southwest Portland, Oregon, listed on the National Register of Historic Places.

It was designed by architect Jamieson K. Parker.

See also
 National Register of Historic Places listings in Southwest Portland, Oregon

References

Houses on the National Register of Historic Places in Portland, Oregon
1930 establishments in Oregon
Houses completed in 1930
Southwest Portland, Oregon
Portland Historic Landmarks